A constitutional referendum was held in Morocco on 4 September 1992. The amended constitution increased the number of seats in the Parliament from 306 to 333, with the number of directly elected seats rising from 204 to 222. It also allowed the Prime Minister to appoint the rest of the cabinet, and for legislation to be promulgated a month after being passed by the Parliament, regardless of whether the monarch had given assent. The changes were approved by 99.96% of voters, with 100% voting in favour in major cities and three of the four provinces in the disputed territory of Western Sahara. Voter turnout was reported to be 97.29%. Fresh elections were held the following year.

Results

References

1992 referendums
Referendums in Morocco
1992 in Morocco
Constitutional referendums in Morocco